Pepper tree is a common name for several plants and may refer to:

 Trees in the genus Schinus
 Macropiper excelsum, or kawakawa, a small tree endemic to New Zealand
 Two species of the genus Pseudowintera, also known by the Māori name of Horopito

See also 

 Pepper leaf (disambiguation)